Carlos Emiliano Rodríguez Rodríguez (born 7 April 1990) is a Uruguayan professional footballer who plays as a defender for Barcelona SC, on loan from L.D.U. Quito.

Career
Rodríguez began his career in Uruguay with Danubio. His first match arrived on 23 August 2009, he featured for the full duration of a 1–2 victory. He went on to make twenty-eight more appearances in his first two seasons with Danubio. In 2011, Rodríguez spent a season on loan with Miramar Misiones. A year later, Miramar Misiones signed Rodríguez permanently. He remained with Miramar Misiones for three seasons in total, featuring in forty-eight domestic fixtures and netting six goals. Ahead of the 2013–14 Uruguayan Segunda División season, Boston River completed the signing of defender Rodríguez.

He scored his first goal for the club on 22 April 2014 versus Central Español, the first of three in two campaigns. On 29 July 2015, Rodríguez joined Uruguayan Primera División side Plaza Colonia. Twenty-nine games and two goals followed in his opening season. In July 2016, Rodríguez left Uruguayan football to play for Argentina's Olimpo on loan. He netted goals against Godoy Cruz, Quilmes, Atlético de Rafaela and Independiente during 2016–17. For 2017–18, Rodríguez was loaned to fellow Argentine Primera División club Tigre. He scored his only goal in his second game, versus Chacarita Juniors.

On 17 July 2018, Rodríguez was loaned by Peñarol. He made fourteen appearances and scored one goal for them as they won the 2018 title. On 23 December, Ecuadorian Serie A side L.D.U. Quito announced the loan signing of Rodríguez. He scored goals against Deportivo Cuenca, Fuerza Amarilla and Universidad Católica in 2019 as they won the Copa Ecuador. He was soon signed permanently. In September 2020, having won the Supercopa Ecuador, Rodríguez was loaned to fellow Serie A team Delfín. He made his debut in a Copa Libertadores defeat to Defensa y Justicia on 18 September.

Career statistics
.

Honours
Peñarol
Uruguayan Primera División: 2018

L.D.U. Quito
Copa Ecuador: 2019
Supercopa Ecuador: 2020

References

External links

1990 births
Living people
Footballers from Salto, Uruguay
Uruguayan footballers
Ecuadorian Serie A players
Danubio F.C. players
Miramar Misiones players
Boston River players
Plaza Colonia players
Olimpo footballers
Club Atlético Tigre footballers
Peñarol players
L.D.U. Quito footballers
Delfín S.C. footballers
Association football defenders
Uruguayan expatriate footballers
Expatriate footballers in Argentina
Expatriate footballers in Ecuador
Uruguayan expatriate sportspeople in Argentina
Uruguayan expatriate sportspeople in Ecuador
Uruguayan Primera División players
Uruguayan Segunda División players
Argentine Primera División players